The 2016 Campeonato Carioca de Futebol was the 113th edition of the top tier football of FFERJ (Federação de Futebol do Estado do Rio de Janeiro, or Rio de Janeiro State Football Federation). The top four teams competed in 2017 Copa do Brasil.

On 4 August 2015, the arbitral tribunal decided to dispute this edition, which would differ from previous editions. Also, 2016 Summer Olympics preparations of the Maracanã Stadium and Estádio Olímpico João Havelange made them unavailable except for the finals. Matches were moved to large stadiums in other cities.

Participating teams

League tables
The sixteen sides were split into two groups of eight, with the top four from both groups advancing to the promotion stage (Taça Guanabara) and the bottom four from both groups advancing to the relegation stage (Taça Rio).

Group A

Group B

Taça Guanabara

Taça Rio

Taça Rio - Final Stage

Semi-finals

Final

Final Stage

Semi-finals

Finals

Awards

Team of the year

Player of the Season
The Player of the Year was awarded to Nenê.

Young Player of the Season
The Young Player of the Year was awarded to Ribamar.

References

Campeonato Carioca seasons
Rio de Janeiro